The 2005–06 season was Klubi i Futbollit Tirana's 67th competitive season, 67th consecutive season in the Kategoria Superiore and 85th year in existence as a football club.

Squad

Competitions

Albanian Supercup

Kategoria Superiore

League table

Results summary

Results by round

Matches

Albanian Cup

Second round

Third round

Quarter-finals

Semi-finals

Final

UEFA Champions League

First qualifying round

Second qualifying round

References 

KF Tirana seasons
Tirana